Richard Wayne Clark (May 9, 1933 – October 5, 2019) was an American politician in the state of Florida.

Clark was born in San Antonio, Texas. He moved to Florida at the age of four and later attended Loyola University, where he was a member of Upsilon Beta Lambda. He served in the Florida House of Representatives from 1968 to 1976, as a Democrat. He also served as Majority Leader of the Florida House of Representatives towards the end of his term.

He was a general contractor by profession. He is also a brother of the former Miami mayor Stephen P. Clark. Clark died on October 5, 2019.

References

2019 deaths
1933 births
Members of the Florida House of Representatives
Loyola University New Orleans alumni
Politicians from San Antonio